The IBM System/360 Model 91 was announced in 1964 as a competitor to the CDC 6600.  Functionally, the Model 91 ran like any other large-scale System/360, but the internal organization was the most advanced of the System/360 line, and it was the first IBM computer to support out-of-order instruction execution. It ran OS/360 as its operating system. It was designed to handle high-speed data processing for scientific applications. This included space exploration, theoretical astronomy, sub-atomic physics and global weather forecasting.

The first Model 91 was used at the NASA Goddard Space Flight Center in 1968 and at the time was the most powerful computer in user operation. It was capable of executing up to 16.6 million instructions per second, making it roughly equivalent to an intel 80486SX-20 MHz CPU or AMD 80386DX-40 MHz CPU in MIPS performance.

The CPU consisted of five autonomous units: instruction, floating-point, fixed-point, and two storage controllers for the overlapping memory units and the I/O data channels. The floating-point unit made heavy use of instruction pipelining and was the first implementation of Tomasulo's algorithm. It was also one of the first computers to utilize multi-channel memory architecture.

Models
There were four models of the IBM System/360 Model 91. They differed by their main memory configuration, all using IBM's 2395 Processor Storage.

The 91K had 2 MB, using one 2395 Model 1.

Both the 91KK and the 91L came with 4 MB of main memory: the former used a pair of 2395 Model 1s, the latter a single 2395 Model 2.

The 6 MB KL was equipped with one Model 1 and one Model 2 IBM 2395s.

Models built
There were only 15 Model 91s ever produced, four of which were for IBM's internal use. After quoting from Pugh et al, William H. Blair says "Many disagree on the number of 360/91s that IBM built or sold. I have read and heard it authoritatively stated that the number was 10, 11, 12, 14, 15, or 20." As for those delivered to customers, "a 360/85 was delivered from when a 91 was ordered until it was ready."

IBM and NASA

IBM had a long history with NASA including the use of IBM components on manned space flights such as the IBM ASC-15 on Saturn 1, the IBM ASC-15B on the Titan Family, IBM GDC on Gemini, IBM LVDC on Saturn 1B/5, IBM System/4 Pi-EP on the MOL, and the IBM System/4 Pi-TC 1 on the Apollo Telescope Mount and Skylab.

The Model 91 was shipped 9 months late to the Goddard Space Flight Center in October 1967 and did not begin regular operations until January 1968 after it passed the federal government operations testing.

IBM System/360 Model 95
The Model 95 was a variant of the Model 91 with 1 megabyte of thin-film memory and 4 megabytes of core memory. NASA acquired the only two 360/95s ever built.

The console of the Model 95, for which no Functional Characteristics manuals exist, was identical to that of the 360/91.

First internet connected server 
In 1971 UCLA used an IBM 360/91 to provide 'production computing services' to ARPANET described in the Paper 'A SERVER HOST SYSTEM ON THE ARPANET' by Robert T. Braden. The services described include job submittal, a "mailbox" system and FTP (file transfer protocol).

In popular culture
There is a Model 91 Panel that is currently on display at the Living Computer Museum in Seattle, Washington that was borrowed and featured in the movie Tomorrowland (2015).

References

Further reading
 Information about the Model 91 and the System/360 Family.

External links
 The IBM 360/91 at Columbia University
 IBM System/360 Model 91 Functional Characteristics
 Computers used by NASA

Computing platforms
System/360 Model 91